Filip Kralevski (born October 26, 1982) was a Macedonian professional basketball Power forward who last played for Vardar Apave.

References

External links
 
 

1982 births
Living people
Macedonian men's basketball players
Power forwards (basketball)
KK Rabotnički players
KK Vardar players